Montipora grisea is a small polyped stony coral in the family Acroporidae.

Description
It is an encrusting species considered to be massively sized, with "thick unifacial plates." It is usually dark brown or green in color, but also appears in shades of blue or pink. These corals have small bumps, known as thecal papillae, that are fused together around the corallite. They also have a coenosteum papillae that is present.

Distribution & habitat
Montipora grisea has a vast range, found within the reefs of forty-five countries and territories throughout the Indian and Pacific oceans. It exists at depths of 3 to 20 meters, with a preference for "shallow, tropical reef environments on upper reef slopes."

Despite being considered a common species with a presently large population, Montipora grisea faces an array of threats. It is moderately susceptible to bleaching, though notably less so than Acropora corals. Other threats include predation from the crown-of-thorns starfish, harvesting for the aquarium trade, climate change and ocean acidification.

Reproduction and Development 
These corals can be hermaphroditic or gonochoric. Their zygote produces planktonic planula larvae. Metamorphosis takes place early before larval settlement occurs on the opposite side of the mouth.

References 

Acroporidae
Cnidarians of the Indian Ocean
Cnidarians of the Pacific Ocean
Marine fauna of Asia
Marine fauna of Oceania
Corals described in 1897